At Your Service is an Irish makeover television programme, the first series of which was broadcast (in eight parts) on RTÉ One in 2008. It is a creation of Waddell Media, who are behind How Long Will You Live? and Looking For Love.

Presented by expert hotelier brothers Francis and John Brennan of the five-star Park Hotel in Kenmare, County Kerry, the premise of the show is that business makeovers are given by the duo to B&Bs, guesthouses and small hotels across Ireland. The advice given covers various aspects of management, including staffing, catering arrangements, menus, room inspections and indoor and outdoor redecoration.

Francis is responsible for the main inspection, whilst John investigates financial issues, searches for new marketing opportunities and advises on how to develop in the future. Francis is particularly known for his meticulous attention to detail.

Broadcast history
The first episode of the original series aired on 4 September 2008, whilst the final episode of that series aired on 23 October 2008.

At Your Service later returned for a second series.

The Brennans appeared together on chat show Tubridy Tonight on 18 October 2008.

There have since been further series.

The Brennans appeared together on The Saturday Night Show in January 2011.

Episode list

Series 1

Series 2

Series 3

Series 4

Series 5

Series 6

Series 7 
(Broadcast January - March 2015)

Series 8  
(Broadcast in January - February 2016)

Series 9  
(Broadcast April - May 2017)

Series 10  
(Broadcast April - May 2018)

Series 11  
(Broadcast April - May 2019)

Series 12  
(Broadcast July - August 2022)

References

External links 
 At Your Service at RTÉ Television

2008 Irish television series debuts
2010s Irish television series
Irish makeover television series
RTÉ original programming